Área Costera Protegida Punta Curiñanco is a natural reserve  from the city of Valdivia, Chile. Punta Curiñanco covers area that includes different types of Valdivian temperate rain forest as well as coastal shrublands, wetlands and sea-side rocks.

References

Protected areas of Los Ríos Region
Coasts of Los Ríos Region
Valdivian temperate rainforest